Rockton is an unincorporated community in Vernon County, Wisconsin, United States in the town of Whitestown. It is located on the Kickapoo River and is served by Wisconsin Highway 131. Rockton is south of Ontario and north of La Farge; these are the closest villages to the community.

References

Unincorporated communities in Wisconsin
Unincorporated communities in Vernon County, Wisconsin